Movers & Shakers  is an Indian late-night talk show hosted by Shekhar Suman that launched in 1997. The show aired on Sony Entertainment Television until August 2011 and then on SAB TV between March and June 2012. The show format included interviews, comedy routines and performances with celebrity guests.

List of episodes

References

External links

Sony SAB original programming
2012 Indian television series endings
Television series by Optimystix Entertainment
1997 Indian television series debuts
2000s Indian television series
Sony Entertainment Television original programming